Robert Madison may refer to:

 Bob Madison (baseball) (1911–1973), African-American pitcher 
 Robert P. Madison (born 1923), African-American architect
 Robert B. Madison (born 1965), founder of the Kingdom of Talossa